In Aztec mythology, Patecatl is a god of healing and fertility and the discoverer of peyote as well as the "lord of the root of pulque".  With Mayahuel, he was the father of the Centzon Totochtin.

In the Aztec calendar, Patecatl is the lord of the thirteen days from 1 Monkey to 13 House. The preceding thirteen days are ruled over by Mictlantecuhtli and the following thirteen by Itztlacoliuhqui.

References

Aztec pulque gods
Fertility gods
Health gods
Alcohol deities